Simonas Krėpšta (born January 17, 1984) is a Lithuanian orienteering competitor. He received bronze medals both in the long course and the short course at the 2004 Junior World Orienteering Championships in Gdańsk.

He won the multiday race O-Ringen in 2006.

References

External links
 Personal website

1984 births
Living people
Lithuanian orienteers
Male orienteers
Foot orienteers
Competitors at the 2009 World Games
Competitors at the 2005 World Games
Junior World Orienteering Championships medalists